Umeå Södra FF is a football club from Umeå, Sweden. The club was established in 1982 with the merging of Röbäcks IF and Tegs SK. The club qualified for the Damallsvenskan league on October 13, 2007 by defeating the Ornäs BK 4–0 in the second to last round of the Swedish Women's Northern Division 1. Once there in 2008, they ended up 11th, and was relegated.

The club includes U-12 through U-18 youth teams.

Umeå Södra FF play their home games at the Gammliavallen Stadium in Umeå. The team colours are yellow and blue.

Current squad

References

External links 
 Umeå Södra FF – Official website 

Women's football clubs in Sweden
Sport in Umeå
1982 establishments in Sweden
Association football clubs established in 1982